YAP is an open-source, high-performance implementation of the Prolog  programming language developed at LIACC/Universidade do Porto and at COPPE Sistemas/UFRJ. Its Prolog engine is based in the WAM (Warren Abstract Machine), with several optimizations for better performance. YAP follows the Edinburgh tradition, and is largely compatible with the ISO-Prolog standard and with Quintus Prolog and SICStus Prolog. YAP has been developed since 1985. The original version was written in assembly, C and Prolog, and achieved high performance on m68k-based machines.

See also 
 Comparison of Prolog implementations

External links
 YAP Prolog website

Free compilers and interpreters
Prolog programming language family